Waldersea railway station is a proposed station situated on the former Wisbech line from March to Wisbech, and will be the proposed terminal of the railway along the disused trackbed.

  

Proposed railway stations in England